Torllwyn is a headland in Angelsey, Wales, approximately  ENE of Porthllechog.

See also

Headlands of Anglesey